Upsilon Coronae Borealis, Latinized from υ Coronae Borealis, is a solitary star in the northern constellation of Corona Borealis. It is a white-hued star that is dimly visible to the naked eye with an apparent visual magnitude of 5.78. The distance to this object is approximately  based on parallax.  

This is an A-type main-sequence star with a stellar classification of A3V; a star that is currently fusing its core hydrogen. However, Palmer et al. (1968) had it classed as type A2IV, and thus it may be near or past its main sequence lifetime. It is a suspected variable star of unknown type that has been measured ranging in brightness from magnitude 5.78 down to 5.88.

Upsilon Coronae Borealis has three times the mass of the Sun and about 1.5 times the Sun's radius. It is spinning with a projected rotational velocity of 112 km/s. The star is radiating 151 times the luminosity of the Sun from its photosphere at an effective temperature of 8,098 K.

References

A-type main-sequence stars
Corona Borealis
Coronae Borealis, Upsilon
Durchmusterung objects
Coronae Borealis, 18
146738
079757
6074